Dog Heaven is a 1927 Our Gang short silent comedy film directed by Anthony Mack. It was the 68th Our Gang short that was released.

Cast

The Gang
 Joe Cobb as Joe
 Jackie Condon as Jackie
 Jean Darling as Jean
 Allen Hoskins as Farina
 Bobby Hutchins as Wheezer
 Mildred Kornman as Mildred
 Jay R. Smith as Jay
 Pete the Pup as himself

Additional cast
 Annette De Kirby as Clarabelle
 Charles A. Bachman as Officer
 Ed Brandenburg as Young lover on park bench
 Lyle Tayo as Lady at accident scene
 Charley Young as man in wheelchair

See also
 Our Gang filmography

References

External links

1927 films
American silent short films
American black-and-white films
1927 comedy films
1927 short films
Films directed by Robert A. McGowan
Metro-Goldwyn-Mayer short films
Our Gang films
Films about animals
Films about dogs
1920s American films
Silent American comedy films